The 1800 United States presidential election in New Jersey took place between October 31 and December 3, 1800, as part of the 1800 United States presidential election. The state legislature chose seven representatives, or electors to the Electoral College, who voted for President and Vice President.

During this election, New Jersey cast seven electoral votes for incumbent Federalist President John Adams. However, Adams would lose to Democratic-Republican Party candidate Thomas Jefferson nationally.

See also
 United States presidential elections in New Jersey

References

New Jersey
1800
1800 New Jersey elections